Valencia, also known as The Love Song, is a 1926 American silent romance film directed by Dimitri Buchowetzki, who came over from Paramount to direct.  The film stars Mae Murray and features Boris Karloff in an uncredited role. The film is presumed lost. The film was a box office hit and the title song, Valencia, was the top song in the U.S. for the year.

Plot
Handsome sailor Felipe (Hughes) and nasty Governor Don Fernando (D'Arcy) are rivals for the favors of Spanish dancer Valencia (Murray). When Felipe deserts his ship, Don Fernando throws him in prison, but Valencia obtains his release and shares his disgrace and exile.

Cast
 Mae Murray as Valencia
 Lloyd Hughes as Felipe
 Roy D'Arcy as Don Fernando
 Max Barwyn as Don Alvarado
 Michael Vavitch as Captain
 Michael Visaroff as Cafe Owner
 Boris Karloff as Bit (uncredited)

See also
 Boris Karloff filmography

References

External links

1926 films
1926 romantic drama films
American romantic drama films
American silent feature films
American black-and-white films
Metro-Goldwyn-Mayer films
Films produced by Irving Thalberg
Films directed by Dimitri Buchowetzki
1920s American films
Silent romantic drama films
Silent American drama films